Neruda is the third studio album by the Canadian rock band Red Rider, released in 1983 (see 1983 in music). The album was recorded at Metalworks Studios in Toronto, Ontario. The figure on the album cover was inspired by Denise Sexton.  The instrumental track "Light In The Tunnel" followed by "Power" (with vocals) have been used to open Red Rider's concerts on several tours. Neruda became Red Rider's third straight platinum album in Canada, selling more than 100,000 copies, and peaking at number 11 on the charts.

Neruda reached number 66 on Billboard's Pop Albums chart in 1983 assisted by the singles "Crack The Sky (Breakaway)" and "Power (Strength In Numbers)" which reached number 39 and number 13 respectively on Billboards Mainstream Rock chart. "Human Race" reached number 29 in Canada and number 11 on Billboards Mainstream Rock chart.

The album is named after Chilean poet Pablo Neruda.

Track "Can't Turn Back" was featured in the Miami Vice season 2 episode "Tale of the Goat".

Track listing

Personnel
 Tom Cochrane - lead vocals, guitars, arrangements
 Ken Greer - guitars, vocals, arrangements
 Rob Baker - drums, percussion
 Jeff Jones - bass guitar, vocals
 Steve Sexton - synthesizers, piano

Additional personnel
 Hugh Syme - art direction and cover design
 Deborah Samuel - photography

References

External links
Lyrics

1983 albums
Red Rider albums
Capitol Records albums
Albums produced by David Tickle
Albums recorded at Metalworks Studios